Juho Vennola's first cabinet was the fifth Government of Republic of Finland. The cabinet's time period was August 15, 1919 – March 15, 1920. It was a minority government.

Assembly

References 

Vennola, 1
1919 establishments in Finland
1920 disestablishments in Finland
Cabinets established in 1919
Cabinets disestablished in 1920